Ismail Khan Lodi (also known by his daak naam Khanja Khan, was a Pashtun general of the Mughal Empire and a former viceroy of Odisha. He also served under the Karrani dynasty of the Sultanate of Bengal.

Early life 
Ismail Khan was born in to an aristocratic family in South Sylhet, Bengal Sultanate (present-day Bangladesh). His father, Sakhi Salamat, was a  Shia nobleman from Greater Khorasan who had settled in the mouza of Prithimpassa. His mother was the daughter of Birchandra Narayan, a Hindu prince of the Ita royal family of Rajnagar. Ismail was a member of the Lodi (Pashtun tribe).

Career 
Khan Lodi started off as an officer under the Karrani dynasty. When Mughal Emperor Humayun returned to India from Persia, Sulaiman Khan Karrani the Sultan of Bengal sent Lodi who had risen to the rank of principal officer to have a conference with the Mughal General Munim Khan. Munim and Lodi decided to recite the Khutba and strike gold coins in the name of Akbar. During Sulaiman's tenure, Lodi was made the Governor of Odisha and Cuttack under the Karrani Dynasty, he also was conferred the title of Khan-e-Jahan by Sultan Sulaiman. After Sulaiman's death Bayazid Khan Karrani became the Sultan of Bengal but was short-lived due to being killed by his cousin Hanso. Hanso was eventually killed by Lodi and installed Sulaiman's son Daud Khan Karrani as the Sultan of Bengal. Daud then had the title Amir al-umara conferred upon Ismail. Later on when Daud heard that Emperor Akbar is sending an army with General Munim Khan, Daud appointed his Premier Noble man Ismail Khan e Jahan Lodi to oppose the Mughals. Both Armies met at Patna which resulted in a peace talk and return to their respectful provinces. After some time between Daud and Lodi estrangement had risen, Lodi Khan being displeased opened up talks with Mughal General Munim Khan. Upon hearing this Daud sent a letter bring Ismail over to his palace and attacked him. Due to Ismail having loyal's in the palace he was saved and returned to his estate. 
In the later part of Ismail's life on 1612 Emperor Jahangir sent his powerful General Shaikh Alauddin Chisti and made Ismail Khan Lodi the local Nawab and provided assurance over his rule. 
He was formally titled as Amir al-umara Nawab Ismail Khan e Jahan Lodi.

Personal life 
Ismail married the daughter of Sultan Daud Khan Karrani and had one issue, a son named Shamsuddin Muhammad Khan who succeeded Ismail as the Nawab.

References 

Mughal Empire people
1520 births
1600 deaths
Governors of Odisha
Bengal Sultanate officers
Prithimpassa family
16th-century Bengalis